Niclas Benjamin Peltonen (born 15 April 1997), known mononymously as Benjamin, is a Finnish singer and songwriter. He originally gained recognition through his Instagram profile, created in 2012. In May 2014, Peltonen signed a record deal with Warner Music Finland.

Career

2014–2017: Square One and Fingerprints 
Peltonen's first single "Underdogs" was released on 8 September 2014. It peaked at number ten on the official singles chart in Finland. In March 2015 the song was added to the playlist of the Spanish radio channel Los 40 Principales. Peltonen released his second single "Unbreakable" on 19 December 2014. His first extended play Square One was released in May 2015, including both prior singles and three new songs, including third single "Young and Restless".

A 20-part documentary series about Peltonen entitled Naked Diary: Benjamin Peltonen, was aired on Yle Areena in the spring of 2015. A longer documentary of the same name was aired on Yle TV2 on 3 May 2015.

Peltonen announced a brand new single called "Body" for release on 4 March 2016, which will precede his debut album. Benjamin's debut album Fingerprints was released in April 2016, including all previous singles, and the entire Square One EP. It debuted on the Finnish album chart at number 17 and the Spanish album chart at number 3. "Man on the Moon", featuring Spanish girl group Sweet California, was the fifth and final single released from the album on 8 July 2016. He released the single "Bad Luck Love" on 8 March 2017.

2018–present: Transition to music in Finnish and  
In 2018, Peltonen started releasing music in Finnish. The first release "" featuring Finnish rapper IBE was released on 10 August 2018. Another single "" was unveiled on 16 November 2017. Its official music video, directed by Karim Saheb and shot in Germany, premiered a day later. More singles followed through 2019: "" on 22 February, "" on 7 June 2020 and "" on 23 August.

In 24 January 2020, a song about his parents' divorce "" premiered along a short prologue video and an upcoming album was teased. Preceded by singles "WWW" and "TikTok", Peltonen's first album in Finnish, was released on 25 September 2020.

His entry "" was co-written with Atso Soivio and Iivari Suosalo, and was released on 13 January 2023. In the final, he finished in seventh place with 66 points (32 points from the televote and 34 points from the juries).

Personal life
Benjamin came out as gay during a live TV concert at Helsinki Pride in July 2021.

Discography

Studio albums

Extended plays

Singles

References

1997 births
Living people
21st-century Finnish male singers
Finnish LGBT singers
Finnish gay musicians
Gay singers
21st-century Finnish LGBT people